The 2023 Ping An Chinese Football Association Super League will be the 20th season since the establishment of the Chinese Super League. The league title sponsor is Ping An Insurance.

Club changes

To Super League
Clubs promoted from 2022 China League One
Kunshan
Qingdao Hainiu
Nantong Zhiyun

From Super League
Clubs relegated to 2023 China League One
Guangzhou
Hebei

Dissolved entries
Wuhan Yangtze River

Name changes

Clubs

Stadiums and Locations

Clubs Locations

Managerial changes

Foreign players
Players name in bold indicates the player is registered during the mid-season transfer window.

 For Hong Kong, Macau, or Taiwanese players, if they are non-naturalized and were registered as professional footballers in Hong Kong's, Macau's, or Chinese Taipei's football association for the first time, they are recognized as native players. Otherwise they are recognized as foreign players.
 Naturalized players whose parents or grandparents were born in Mainland China, thus are regarded as local players.

League table

Results

Positions by round

Statistics
Will be updated as the season starts.

Awards

References

External links
Current CSL table, and recent results/fixtures at Soccerway

Chinese Super League seasons
1
China